Troy Hill may refer to:

 Troy Hill (American football) (born 1991), NFL cornerback
 Troy Hill (Pittsburgh), a neighborhood in Pittsburgh
 Troy Hill Incline, a funicular railway

See also
 Parsippany-Troy Hills, New Jersey, a township